Marcin Knackfus (c. 1742 – c. 1821) was a Polish–Lithuanian Neoclassical architect of German descent. Born near Warsaw, he worked in the Grand Duchy of Lithuania and particularly in its capital Vilnius. He was a tutor of Laurynas Gucevičius.

Knackfus was influenced by other Polish–German architects of late Baroque (Ephraim Schröger and Szymon Bogumił Zug) and early Neoclassicism (Domenico Merlini and Johann Christian Kammsetzer). He moved to Vilnius around 1768. Knackfus served as captain of the Army of Grand Duchy of Lithuania and lectured at military engineering school. Between 1773 and 1777 he taught courses in theory and practical application of architecture at Vilnius University. He participated in the 1794 Kościuszko Uprising. Fearing persecutions of the Tsarist authorities, he retreated to Suvalkija and largely retired.

His works include Verkiai Palace (1769–1781), Palace of de  Reuss in front of the Daukantas Square (1775), expansion of Astronomical Observatory of Vilnius University (1782–1788), late Baroque churches of Troškūnai (1774–1787) and Kurtuvėnai (1783–1792), Vilnius Botanical Garden (1784), altar for All Saints Church, Vilnius (1787), St. Bartholomew Church in Užupis (1788), supervision of the construction of the Green Bridge (1789), church in Trakai (1789–1790), Tyzenhaus Palace (around 1790), archives of the Lithuanian Tribunal (1790), residential palace (presently used by Vilnius Conservatory of Juozas Tallat-Kelpša; 1790), manor and park in Paežeriai, Vilkaviškis district (1794), parish school in Troškūnai (1796), Basanavičius street in Vilnius (1798).

Knackfus worked with numerous nobles, including Bishops Ignacy Jakub Massalski and Ignacy Krasicki, Field Hetman Ludwik Tyszkiewicz, voivode Karol Stanisław Radziwiłł, Adam Kazimierz Czartoryski, Grand Marshal Stanisław Lubomirski.

References

Notes

Bibliography

  
 
 
 

German neoclassical architects
Architects from Vilnius
Kościuszko insurgents
1740s births
1820s deaths
Academic staff of Vilnius University